Ada Clare  (pen names, Clare and Ada Clare; July 1834 – March 4, 1874) was an American actress and writer.

Life and career
Ada Agnes Jane McElhenney was born in Charleston, South Carolina in 1834. She grew up under the care of her maternal grandfather as part of an aristocratic Southern family, but started her career as a writer around age 18, writing under the pseudonyms Clare and later Ada Clare.

She moved to New York City in 1854, took up acting, engaged in a widely publicized liaison with pianist and composer Louis Moreau Gottschalk, and bore a son out of wedlock.   During the height of her acting career, she frequented Pfaff's Cellar, where she became known as the "Queen of Bohemia". She also wrote for the Saturday Press, an iconoclastic weekly magazine of the arts.  Her only novel, entitled Only a Woman's Heart, was poorly received by reviewers, who criticized the author for her lack of skill with plot and dialogue.  Clare was devastated, and returned to acting in a provincial stock company.  On September 9, 1868, Clare married actor Frank Noyes in Houston, Texas.

Clare suffered a dog bite in her theatrical agent's office and died from rabies in 1874.

See also 
 Pfaff's beer cellar
 Fatal dog attacks in the United States

References

External links
Ada Clare, Queen of Bohemia, by Charles Warren Stoddard, National Magazine, September 1905
Obituary, Brief Chronicles, William Winter
2 short radio segments of Clare's writing from California Legacy Project Radio Anthology (scripts and audio)
Only a Woman's Heart, by Ada Clare. New York: M. Doolady, 1866.

Actresses from Charleston, South Carolina
1836 births
1874 deaths
Deaths from rabies
Deaths due to animal attacks in the United States
American columnists
19th-century American actresses
Accidental deaths in New York (state)
Infectious disease deaths in New York (state)
Neurological disease deaths in New York (state)
American stage actresses
Writers from Charleston, South Carolina
American women columnists
19th-century American journalists
19th-century American women writers
American women non-fiction writers
19th-century women journalists